Revenge of the Nerds is an American comedy franchise. The series revolves around a group of socially-inept students (the nerds) trying to get revenge on their harassers. The series began with the eponymous 1984 film and was followed by three sequels: Revenge of the Nerds II: Nerds in Paradise (1987), Revenge of the Nerds III: The Next Generation (1992) (TV), and Revenge of the Nerds IV: Nerds in Love (1994) (TV). A remake of the first film was to begin filming in October 2006 for a prospective release in 2007, but was cancelled due to problems securing a viable filming location. In December 2020 it was announced that Family Guy creator Seth MacFarlane would reboot the series under his Fuzzy Door Productions label.

Cast

Crew

Reception

References 

20th Century Studios franchises
American film series
Comedy film series
Film series introduced in 1984
Films about fraternities and sororities
Nerd culture
Revenge of the Nerds